Echinopsis strigosa,  is a species of Soehrensia in the cactus family. It is native to north western Argentina.
It was first published in Cactaceae Syst. Init. 28: 31 in 2012.

It was formerly a species of Echinopsis.

References

External links
 
 

Flora of Northwest Argentina
strigosa